Piazza del Duomo (English: "Cathedral Square") is located in the heart of the historic center of Florence (Tuscany, Italy). It is one of the most visited places in Europe and the world and in Florence, the most visited area of the city. The square contains Florence Cathedral with the Cupola del Brunelleschi, the Giotto's Campanile, the Florence Baptistery, the Loggia del Bigallo, the Opera del Duomo Museum, and the Arcivescovile and Canonici's palace. The west zone of this square is called Piazza San Giovanni.

Buildings

The Dome was designed by Filippo Brunelleschi.
Giotto's Bell Tower: Standing adjacent the Basilica of Santa Maria del Fiore and the Baptistery of St. John, the tower is one of the showpieces of the Florentine Gothic architecture with its design by Giotto, its rich sculptural decorations and the poly-chrome marble encrustations.
Baptistery of St. John: The octagonal Baptistery stands across from the Duomo cathedral and the Giotto bell tower (Campanile di Giotto). It is one of the oldest buildings in the city, built between 1059 and 1128. The architecture is in Florentine Romanesque style.
Museo dell'Opera del Duomo: in front of the Florence Cathedral, it is committed to the conservation of the Duomo and other art works. It stores great masterpieces of Michelangelo, Donatello, Lorenzo Ghiberti, Luca della Robbia, Arnolfo di Cambio and many others.
Loggia del Bigallo
Venerabile Arciconfraternita della Misericordia
Palazzo dei Canonici
Palazzo Strozzi di Mantova
Torrini Museum
Palazzo Arcivescovile
Torre dei Marignolli
Opera di San Giovanni
San Zanobi Column, beside the Baptistery.

See also
Florence
Squares of Florence

References

External links 
 

Duomo
Odonyms referring to a building
Odonyms referring to religion